James Vincent McCourt (born 24 January 1944) is a former Irish boxer from Northern Ireland.

McCourt won a bronze medal for Ireland in the 1964 Summer Olympics in Tokyo in the lightweight division. McCourt lost a controversial 3-2 decision to Russian Velikton Barannikov. Shortly after the games, McCourt defeated Olympic champion Józef Grudzień of Poland.  A year later, he repeated his bronze medal performance at the 1965 European Amateur Boxing Championships in Berlin in the same grade. In 1966, McCourt won a gold medal, representing Northern Ireland, at the Commonwealth Games in Kingston in the Light Welterweight division. McCourt was rated the number one amateur boxer in the world for four years. A master of defence and counter punching, he is inducted in the Irish Amateur Boxing Hall of Fame.

External links
profile

1944 births
Living people
Male boxers from Northern Ireland
Olympic boxers of Ireland
Boxers at the 1964 Summer Olympics
Boxers at the 1968 Summer Olympics
Olympic bronze medalists for Ireland
Commonwealth Games gold medallists for Northern Ireland
Boxers at the 1966 British Empire and Commonwealth Games
Olympic medalists in boxing
Irish male boxers
Medalists at the 1964 Summer Olympics
Commonwealth Games medallists in boxing
Lightweight boxers
Medallists at the 1966 British Empire and Commonwealth Games